The Josiah Quincy House , located at 20 Muirhead Street in the Wollaston neighborhood of Quincy, Massachusetts, was the country home of Revolutionary War soldier Colonel Josiah Quincy I, the first in a line of six men named Josiah Quincy that included three Boston mayors and a president of Harvard University.

History
Having inherited the land from father Edmund, Josiah built his mansion on a  farm called the "Lower Farm," which had been in the family since 1635. The house was built in 1770 and was originally surrounded by fields and pasture overlooking Quincy Bay. It is constructed with an unusual hipped monitor roof, the oldest known example of this roof style to survive from the original colonies, and includes a Chinese fretwork balustrade and classical portico. Its attic contains four small rooms for servants, one with a fireplace.

During the American Revolution, Quincy aided General George Washington by observing the British fleet in Boston Harbor from his attic windows. He scratched on a pane of glass in the attic, "October 10, 1775 Governor Gage saild for England with a fair wind." That glass pane has been preserved and now on view in the front hall.

In 1895, the house and some adjoining properties were sold to Frank E. Hall of Boston. In 1937, Edward R. Hall arranged for the Josiah Quincy House to become the property of the Society for the Preservation of New England Antiquities. The house is now owned by Historic New England, a non-profit historical organization, and is open only four Saturdays a year and by special appointment.  It was designated a National Historic Landmark in 1997 for its architectural significance and for its association with the Quincy family.

See also
Josiah Quincy Mansion
Dorothy Quincy House
Quincy family
List of National Historic Landmarks in Massachusetts
National Register of Historic Places listings in Quincy, Massachusetts

Notes and references

External links
 Historic New England: Quincy House
 Eastern Nazarene College history class project on the Josiah Quincy House.  Includes an extensive bibliography; maps, prints, and photos; links; and more.

Houses completed in 1770
Historic house museums in Massachusetts
National Historic Landmarks in Massachusetts
Quincy family homestead
Museums in Quincy, Massachusetts
Houses in Quincy, Massachusetts
National Register of Historic Places in Quincy, Massachusetts
Historic New England
1770 establishments in Massachusetts
Houses on the National Register of Historic Places in Norfolk County, Massachusetts
Georgian architecture in Massachusetts